Frank Edward Summers (born September 6, 1985) is a former American football fullback and special teamer. He was drafted in the fifth round of the 2009 NFL Draft by the Pittsburgh Steelers. He played college football at UNLV.

College career
Nicknamed "The Tank" due to his build and powerful running style, Summers signed with the University of California, Berkeley out of high school. After redshirting the 2004 season at California, he transferred to Laney College in Oakland, where he played in 2005 and 2006. He was a member of the JC Athletic Bureau All-American first-team in 2005. He then chose UNLV over Southern California because the Rebels offered him a chance to remain at running back while the Trojans wanted him to move to fullback. Utah and Washington State also recruited him. An immediate starter for the Rebels as a junior, Summers started all 12 games, rushing for 928 yards and scoring six touchdowns in earning Mountain West Conference honorable mention accolades. His rushing total dropped to 740 yards in 2009, but he improved upon his scoring (eight touchdowns) and showed enough at the Texas vs The Nation game and in subsequent workouts to earn a late-round look.

Professional career

Pittsburgh Steelers
Summers was drafted in the fifth round of the 2009 NFL Draft by the Pittsburgh Steelers

After playing the first two games of the 2009 season at fullback, Summers was placed on injured reserve for the rest of the season.

During the 2010 preseason, he practiced at both halfback and fullback. Summers was released by the Pittsburgh Steelers on September 4, 2010.

He was signed to the Steelers' practice squad on September 6, 2010.

San Diego Chargers
On February 16, 2011, Summers was signed by the San Diego Chargers. He was released on September 3, 2011.

Buffalo Bills
Summers signed with the Buffalo Bills on April 18, 2013. He scored his first touchdown against the New York Jets, on November 17, 2013. On December 16, 2014 the Buffalo Bills announced they had released Summers.

Personal
His second cousin, Martin Tevaseu, is of Samoan descent and played defensive tackle in the NFL. After retiring from football, Summers completed his bachelor's degree at UNLV in 2016.

References

External links
UNLV Rebels bio
Athlete Chat: Pittsburgh Steeler Frank Summers - Access Athletes

1985 births
Living people
Pittsburgh Steelers players
Buffalo Bills players
UNLV Rebels football players
American football running backs
American sportspeople of Samoan descent
Players of American football from Oakland, California
University of California, Berkeley alumni
Laney Eagles football players